The Six Dravidians were six Tamil rulers apparently from the Pandyan Dynasty who ruled the Anuradhapura Kingdom from 436  to 452 CE. They are said to be Buddhist, taking Buddhist epithets such as the 'servant of Buddha' and are known to have made several Buddhist donations.

Background

Before the Six Dravidians had invaded the island, the Anuradhapura Kingdom was ruled by Mittasena (435-436).

Rulers

Pandu

Pandu was the first of the Six Dravidians. He was a Pandyan, in South India, who established foreign rule in Anuradhapura through a Pandyan invasion. He ruled from 436 to 441

Parindu

Parindu, the son of Pandu, was the second of the Six Dravidians. He ruled for less than a year in 441.

Khudda Parinda

Khudda Parinda, the third of the Six Dravidians, reigned from 441 to 447. He was the younger brother of Parindu.

Tiritara

Tiritara was the fourth of the Six Dravidians. He ruled for two months in 447 until he was defeated and killed by Dhatusena.

Dathiya

Dathiya was the fifth of the Six Dravidians, who ruled for two years from 447 to 450. He was defeated and killed by Dhatusena.

Pithiya

Pithiya was the last of the Six Dravidians, who ruled for two years from 450 to 452. He was defeated and killed by Dhatusena.

See also
 List of Sri Lankan monarchs
 History of Sri Lanka
 Mahavamsa

References

External links
  VIJAYA and the Lankan Monarchs
 Lakdiva - LIST OF THE SOVEREIGNS OF LANKA
 The Mahavamsa History of Sri Lanka The Great Chronicle of Sri Lanka
 Complete list of Sri Lankan Leaders

Lists of monarchs
Sri Lanka history-related lists
Monarchs of Anuradhapura
Tamil monarchs
Usurpers of the Sinhalese throne
5th-century Sinhalese monarchs